Stylidium eriopodum is a dicotyledonous plant that belongs to the genus Stylidium (family Stylidiaceae). A creeping perennial, herb which forms in compact clumps to 15 cm wide. Only found in the south west corner of Western Australia. The preferred habitat is eucalyptus woodland or shrublands. Attractive colourful flowers appear in October and November. This plant first appeared in scientific literature in 1839, in the Prodromus Systematis Naturalis Regni Vegetabilis published by the Swiss botanist Augustin Pyramus de Candolle.

See also 
 List of Stylidium species

References 

Eudicots of Western Australia
eriopodum
Plants described in 1839
Asterales of Australia